Friedrich von Wirsberg (16 November 1507 – 12 November 1573) was the Prince-Bishop of Würzburg from 1558 to 1573.

Friedrich von Wirsberg was born in Glashütten, Bavaria on November 16, 1507.

On April 15, 1558, Melchior Zobel von Giebelstadt, Prince-Bishop of Würzburg, was assassinated by the forces of Wilhelm von Grumbach.  The cathedral chapter of Würzburg Cathedral elected Friedrich von Wirsberg as Zobel's successor on April 27, 1558.  Von Grumbach claimed he was not involved in the murder of Zobel, but Bishop von Wirsberg was determined to bring von Grumbach to justice.  Von Grumbach, along with Albert Alcibiades, Margrave of Brandenburg-Kulmbach, sought refuge in the Kingdom of France.

In 1560, von Wirsberg expelled all Jews from the Prince-Bishopric of Würzburg.

He died on November 12, 1573, and is buried in Würzburg Cathedral (grave #14, grave plate #59 on diagram).

References

1507 births
1573 deaths
Prince-Bishops of Würzburg
16th-century Roman Catholic bishops in Bavaria